Euoplothrips is a genus of thrips in the family Phlaeothripidae.

Species
 Euoplothrips bagnalli
 Euoplothrips buxtoni
 Euoplothrips carcinoides
 Euoplothrips malabaricus
 Euoplothrips platypodae
 Euoplothrips uncinatus

References

Phlaeothripidae
Thrips
Thrips genera